Gaskill may refer to:

Places
 Gaskill, Kentucky
 Gaskill Township, Jefferson County, Pennsylvania

People with the surname
 Brian Gaskill (born 1970), American actor
 E. Thurman Gaskill (born 1935), American politician
 Gudy Gaskill (1927–2016), American mountaineer, driving force behind creation of the Colorado Trail
 Jerry Gaskill (born 1957), American rock musician
 Joseph H. Gaskill, (1851–1935) American judge
 Malcolm Gaskill (born 1967), English historian and author 
 Mary Gaskill (born 1941), American politician
 Nelson B. Gaskill (1875–1964), chair of the Federal Trade Commission 
 William Gaskill (1930–2016), British theatre director

See also
 Gaskell